Major-General Keith John McQueen (17 June 1923 – 2 June 2000) was a British Army officer.

Military career
McQueen was commissioned into the Royal Artillery in August 1944 during the Second World War. He became Commander, Royal Artillery for 3rd Infantry Division in 1968, Commandant, Royal School of Artillery in 1973 and General Officer Commanding North West District in 1974 before retiring in 1977.

References

 

1923 births
2000 deaths
British Army generals
Royal Artillery officers
British Army personnel of World War II